Iron Heart or Ironheart may refer to:

People
 Cantemaza, Chief Ironheart (1822 1896), a leader of the Wahpeton Spirit Lake Tribe
 Reinhard Heydrich (1904 1942), nicknamed "the man with the iron heart", SS Officer and Nazi governor of occupied Czechoslovakia

Fictional characters
 Ironheart (character), a superhero from Marvel Comics
 Morag Ironheart, a character created by Peter Simple
 Luther Ironheart, a character from the comic book series American Flagg!
 Lorkon Ironheart, a character from the 2009 James M. Stuart novel Lord of Meledor
 Koo the Iron Heart, a character from the 1979 film His Name Is Nobody
 Jason Ironheart, a character from Babylon 5
 Teppei Kiyoshi, aka Iron Heart, a character  from the anime series Kuroko's Basketball
 Mr. Ironheart, a fictional spy from the animanga 009-1

Fictional locations
 Iron Heart, a fictional building from the video game Neverwinter
 Iron Heart, a fictional country from the RPG Rifts

Film and television

Film
 Ironheart (film), a 1992 martial arts film starring Bolo Yeung
 The Iron Heart (1917 film) a lost silent film directed by George Fitzmaurice 
 The Iron Heart (1920 film), a silent film directed by Denison Clift

Television
 Ironheart (TV series), an upcoming Marvel Cinematic Universe (MCU) series based on the comic character
 "Iron Heart", an episode of Psycho-Pass
 The Iron Heart (TV series), a 2022 Filipino action drama series

Literature
 Ironheart, a 2019 Marvel Comics limited-series comic book
 War Machine Vol. 1: Iron Heart, a Marvel Comics 2009 comic book about War Machine
 IRON HEART, a manga in the Gundam metaverse
 An Iron Heart, a chapter of the manga Rave Master
 The Iron Heart, a 2009 novel by Marshall Browne
 Iron Heart, a 1923 novel by William MacLeod Raine

Music
The Iron Heart (band), an American rock band
Eisenherz (Ironheart), a 2002 album and its title song by Joachim Witt, also called 
Laney Amplification Ironheart, a series of guitar amps
"Iron Heart", a song by Blutengel from the 2002 album Angel Dust
"Alma" (song), aka "Iron Heart", a song and single by Fonseca from the 2008 album Gratitud
"Iron Heart", a song by A Storm of Light from the 2008 album And We Wept the Black Ocean Within
"Ironheart", a song by Two Steps from Hell from the 2010 album Power of Darkness
"Iron Heart", a song by Netsky from the 2010 album Netsky
"My Iron Heart", a 2019 song by Miss Vincent

Other uses
 Iron Heart, a 2010 St. Petersburg exhibition of paintings by Sergey Bashkirov
 "Iron Heart", a fictional martial art from Tome of Battle: The Book of Nine Swords
 Iron Heart, a 2003 women's pro-wrestling meet of the AAAW Single Championship

See also

Hearts of Iron, a 2002 video game